Manana Kochladze (born c. 1972) is a Georgian biologist and environmentalist. She was awarded the Goldman Environmental Prize in 2004 for her environmental campaigns, in particular regarding oil pipelines through vulnerable areas.

Originally trained to be a scientist, she changed focus to become an environmental activist. In 1990 she founded the non-governmental organization Green Alternative.

References 

Year of birth missing (living people)
Living people
Scientists from Tbilisi
Environmentalists from Georgia (country)
Goldman Environmental Prize awardees